The Hunt is a 2012 Danish psychological drama film directed by Thomas Vinterberg and starring Mads Mikkelsen. It is set in a small Danish village around Christmas, and follows a man who becomes the target of mass hysteria after being wrongly accused of sexually abusing a child in his kindergarten class.

The film gained critical acclaim for Mikkelsen's performance and Vinterberg's direction. Many have described it as one of the best psychological drama films of the last few years. It was competed at the 65th Cannes Film Festival, where Mikkelsen won the Best Actor Award for his role, and was also screened at the 2012 Toronto International Film Festival, among other film festivals. It won the 2013 Nordic Council Film Prize and was one of the nominees for Best Foreign Language Film at the 71st Golden Globe Awards. It was the Danish entry for the Best Foreign Language Film category at the 86th Academy Awards and was selected as one of the final five nominees.

Plot
Lucas is a member of a close-knit rural Danish community. He misses his teenage son, Marcus, who mostly lives with his ex-wife, but he gets along well with the young children at the local kindergarten where he has worked since the school at which he taught closed. When Marcus says he wants to live with Lucas and Lucas starts to date Nadja, a co-worker, his fortunes seem to be looking up.

Klara, who is the daughter of Lucas' best friend, Theo, as well as a pupil at Lucas' kindergarten, has a tendency to wander off on her own when her parents argue, and Lucas occasionally happens upon her when she is alone and helps her out. He accommodates her aversion to stepping on cracks and says she can walk his dog whenever she wants, and, over time, Klara develops a crush on Lucas. When she kisses him on the mouth and gives him a small gift, he gently rebuffs her and she becomes dejected. Using details from a pornographic picture shown to her by a friend of her older brother, Klara makes comments that lead Grethe, the director of the kindergarten, to believe Lucas exposed himself to her. Grethe invites an acquaintance to interview Klara and, after Klara nods in response to the man's leading questions, Grethe, who does not believe that children lie about such things, alerts the authorities and informs the parents of the children who attend the kindergarten. Klara later contradicts her initial story, but the adults see this as stemming from denial of what happened to her.

Lucas loses his job, his friendship with Theo is destroyed, and he is shunned by the community as a pedophile and outcast. Due to the vague language used and the secrecy around the investigation, he does not know what specifically he is supposed to have done, but he eventually hears he may have been accused of abusing multiple children. The strain of this revelation leads him to break up with Nadja when he thinks she doubts his innocence.

Marcus runs away from his mother to be with Lucas. After a trip to the grocery store, where he is told that neither he nor his father are welcome anymore, he sees Lucas being arrested by the police. Locked out of the house, Marcus goes to ask Theo for a spare key and ends up fighting with several adults for confronting Klara and asking why she lied about his father. He is taken in by Bruun, one of Lucas' friends, and his family, who believe Lucas is innocent. Bruun tells Marcus that Lucas has a hearing in the morning and he is hopeful the case against Lucas will be dropped, since he has heard that all of the children's accounts of their abuse mention the same details of the basement of Lucas' house, which does not have a basement.

Lucas is released from custody, but someone kills his dog and throws a stone through his window, so he sends Marcus back to his ex-wife. On Christmas Eve, he gets beaten up and thrown out of the grocery store when he refuses to leave without his food; however, he headbutts the butcher to get his groceries back. At church, he notices Theo and his wife, who saw him limp out of the store bleeding from his head, whispering during the service, so he challenges Theo to look in his eyes for a sign he is lying about his innocence, since Theo had previously stated he can always tell when Lucas is lying. When Theo goes to put Klara to bed that night, she reaffirms that Lucas did not do anything bad to her. He brings Lucas food and alcohol and the two men sit together to talk.

By the next fall, tensions in the community have lessened, and Lucas's friends greet him again as before. He and Nadja have gotten back together. Marcus receives his first rifle at a ceremony at Bruun's house. Lucas and Klara reunite, and he carries her in his arms to take her to Theo.

After assembling, the adult men go hunting on the surrounding estate. When Lucas is by himself, a bullet whizzes past his head. He turns and watches as the shooter, silhouetted against the sun, reloads his rifle and points it for a moment before he flees.

Cast
 Mads Mikkelsen as Lucas
 Thomas Bo Larsen as Theo, Lucas' best friend, Agnes' husband, and Klara's father
 Annika Wedderkopp as Klara, Theo and Agnes' daughter
 Lasse Fogelstrøm as Marcus, Lucas' son
 Susse Wold as Grethe, Lucas' boss
 Anne Louise Hassing as Agnes, Theo's wife and Klara's mother
 Lars Ranthe as Bruun, Lucas' friend, Marcus's godfather
 Alexandra Rapaport as Nadja, Lucas' girlfriend
 Sebastian Bull Sarning as Torsten, Theo and Agnes' son, Klara's older brother, and Marcus' friend
 Bjarne Henriksen as Ole

Production
The film was produced by Zentropa for 20 million Danish kroner. It received co-production support from Sweden's Film i Väst and Zentropa International Sweden. Further support came from the Danish Film Institute, DR, Eurimages, Nordisk Film & TV Fond, the Swedish Film Institute, Sveriges Television, and the MEDIA Programme.

Release

The Hunt premiered on 20 May 2012 at the Cannes Film Festival, where it was the first Danish-language film in the main competition since 1998. Mads Mikkelsen won the Best Actor Award at the festival.

The film was released on DVD and Blu-ray in the United States on 10 December 2013.

Reception

Box office
Given its estimated $3.8 million budget, the film was a financial success. Worldwide, it earned more than $16 million, including $7.9 million in Denmark. In the United States, it was shown in 47 theaters and earned $613,308.

Critical response

The film received universal acclaim. It has an approval rating of 93% on Rotten Tomatoes based on 134 reviews, with an average rating of 7.82/10; the website's critical consensus reads: "Anchored by Mads Mikkelsen's sympathetic performance, The Hunt asks difficult questions with the courage to pursue answers head on." On Metacritic, it has a score of 77 out of 100 based on 30 critics, indicating "generally favorable reviews".

Accolades

Stage adaptation 
The Hunt was adapted for the stage in 2019 by David Farr, and produced at the Almeida Theatre in London. The production was directed by Rupert Goold and starred Tobias Menzies as Lucas. The production ran between 19 June – 3 August 2019.

See also
 List of submissions to the 86th Academy Awards for Best Foreign Language Film
 List of Danish submissions for the Academy Award for Best Foreign Language Film

References

External links
 
 
 
 
 
 

2012 films
2010s Danish-language films
2012 drama films
2012 independent films
2010s psychological drama films
Danish drama films
Danish independent films
Films about bullying
Films about educators
Films about mental health
Films about pedophilia
Films directed by Thomas Vinterberg
Films set in Denmark
Films shot in Denmark
Danish Christmas films
Fiction with false allegations of sex crimes
Films with screenplays by Tobias Lindholm